Katla Margrét Þorgeirsdóttir (born 1970) is an Icelandic actress, voice actress and writer. She is known for her role as Laufey in Trapped.

Career 
Katla graduated from the Icelandic Drama School (now a department under the Iceland Academy of the Arts) in 1997. She has been involved in multiple productions on stage such as Jungle Book (based on the book by Rudyard Kipling), Sound of Music, the Wizard of Oz, Pippi Longstocking and Fanny and Alexander.

Selected filmography 
 Maður eins og ég (2002) as Magga
 Kaldaljós (2004) as Lára
 The Incredibles (2004) (Icelandic voice of Mirage)
 Fangavaktin (2009) (TV-series) as Emilía
 Bjarnfreðarson (2009) as Prison guard Emilía
 Órói (2010) as Gréta's mother
 Hetjur Valhallar - Þór (2011) (Icelandic voice)
 Wreck it Ralph (2012) (Icelandic voice of Calhoun)
 Þrestir (2015) as Ösp
 Trapped (2015-2016) (TV-series) as Laufey

References

External links 
 

Living people
1970 births
Katla M. Thorgeirsdottir
Katla M. Thorgeirsdottir
Katla M. Thorgeirsdottir